Tim Skold (born Thim Sköld) is a Swedish musician and record producer who produces solo work and has also collaborated with multiple musical groups including Shotgun Messiah, KMFDM, Marilyn Manson and Motionless in White.

Biography

Early life
Skold grew up in Timmersdala, 21 kilometres northwest of Skövde.
He has a sister named Linda. Skold grew up in a very liberal setting as the son of a 15-year-old mother named Åse and a father trying to get by as a semi-professional drummer.

At age 11, Skold joined a playback band (where the band mimes over recorded material). Skold's band would play for people at school meetings with Kiss, Bowie and Sweet songs playing on a cassette player.

Skold first rented a bass guitar at age 12, and by the time he was 13, he was playing and singing in his first real band. Skold later met guitarist Harry Cody at a New Year's Eve party, and they formed a creative partnership that would last for many years to come. Their dream was to go to the US to be rock stars. At age 17, after 2 years of studying Process Engineering at a boarding school, Skold moved into his own apartment and took a factory job making military equipment. A half-year later, he was drafted into the army. He brought his bass to the base and sneaked into the shower stalls to practice after everyone went to sleep. Skold also kept rehearsing with Cody on the weekends, and once out of the army he took on many odd jobs including library assistant, Volvo employee and as a gardener at a bathhouse.

At age 19, Skold and Cody talked a Swedish record company into allowing them to make a record, which they could use as a demo to reach the American market. Starting off as Shylock, their determination soon paid off in the form of Kingpin.

Kingpin
During the early '80s, bassist Skold and guitarist Cody formed the glam metal band Kingpin in their native Skövde, Sweden. They were inspired by the flamboyant hard rock bands flowing out of Los Angeles at the time, as well as the UK acts such as Sigue Sigue Sputnik and Zodiac Mindwarp.

The band kicked off their career with a 7" single titled "Shout It Out" (which hit #1 in Sweden) in 1987. They then drafted vocalist Zinny J. Zan and drummer Stixx Galore a short time later. Kingpin released their only Swedish album, Welcome to Bop City, the following year, and then moved to Los Angeles.

Shotgun Messiah
Signed by Cliff Cultreri at Relativity Records, Kingpin changed their name to Shotgun Messiah (due to a San Francisco-based band holding the rights to the name Kingpin), remixed and re-packaged Welcome To Bop City as a self-titled album, and released it as their international debut in 1989.

After having MTV smash hits such as "Don't Care 'Bout Nothin'" and "Shout It Out", whilst the band was in progress of making a follow-up to their debut self-titled album, Zan was let go. They hired a new bassist, Bobby Lycon, from New York City, and on Cody's suggestion, Tim Tim switched to lead vocals. At this time, Tim Tim, whose role was now frontman, went by the name Tim Skold. They released Second Coming in October 1991, which was enthusiastically received by the media and was their most successful album to date. The album featured two singles, "Heartbreak Blvd." and "Living Without You".

November 1992 saw the release of the five-track EP I Want More, which featured two new punk cover tracks and the re-recorded "Babylon" punk cover, along with the re-recorded "I Want More" edit and an acoustic version of "Nobody's Home", all three from their previous album Second Coming. Soon after came the departure of Stixx and Lycon.

Still under contract with Relativity Records, Skold and Cody returned to Sweden for the recording of the third Shotgun Messiah album, Violent New Breed, which leaned towards the industrial end of heavy metal. The album was released in September 1993 and is now considered a cult classic due to the "before its time" incorporation of industrial influences. However, at the time of release, it received mixed reviews and continued public indifference, which eventually convinced Skold and Cody to end the band, leading Skold to embark on his solo project, Skold.

SKOLD
After the break-up of Shotgun Messiah, Skold went on to pursue a solo career. Writing all songs and playing all instruments himself, his self-titled debut album, Skold, was released in 1996 by RCA. The album was co-produced with Scott Humphrey.

Promoting his debut album, Skold and the rest of the live SKOLD band went on a short tour with Genitorturers. Some of the songs on the Skold album were used in movies like Disturbing Behavior ("Hail Mary"), Universal Soldier: The Return ("Chaos") and the PlayStation game Twisted Metal 4 ("Chaos"). During his solo career, Skold also provided remixes for several bands, such as Prong, Nature and Drown. He also met KMFDM front-man Sascha Konietzko during his time in the studio.

Around 2002, Skold recorded a follow up to his 1996 self-titled album. Skold stated in an interview with The Sychophant that he had made a demo with 10 copies ever made. The demo had 10 songs on it. Six of the 10 were released on file sharing networks without Skold's permission: "Burn", "Dead God", "I Hate", "Believe", "The Point", and "Don't Pray". The demo is known as the Dead God EP, although Skold says that it was called Disrupting the Orderly Routine of the Institution. The original artwork was made with an inkjet printer and was the title written in drippy letters. This demo was given to several friends that Skold considered trustworthy, but his songs appeared on the internet from one of them. Skold said that "someone suggested to me that I should go back to them and finish it off and release it. And maybe I will one day, who knows?" All 10 songs were eventually officially released in 2022 as the album Dead God.

On 3 November 2009 "I Will Not Forget", "A Dark Star", and "Bullets Ricochet" were released on iTunes and Amazon as new SKOLD singles. Also that November, Skold's official website announced that he was to release his second solo album in early 2010. However, the album remained unreleased in 2010. In January 2011, Metropolis Records announced that they were releasing the new record and single in spring of 2011. On 10 May 2011 SKOLD released Anomie.

Originally announced on 17 March 2014, the album, entitled The Undoing, was originally slated for self-release in April 2014. Problems with that model arose and the album release was halted until 2016 when SKOLD rejoined with Metropolis Records to release the work. In support of this album, SKOLD began "The Undoing Tour 2016" in May, 2016 with the western United States; the live line up featured Tiffany Lowe on keyboards and Eli James on drums. This was followed by a cross-US North American tour in November and December 2016.

In 2018, SKOLD released a cover of the song "White As Chalk" by Leæther Strip on the compilation album Heært Combine.

On 5 April 2019, SKOLD released the album Never Is Now on Cleopatra Records.

On 5 March 2021, SKOLD released the album Dies Irae on Cleopatra Records.

KMFDM and MDFMK
After a short-lived solo career, Skold joined KMFDM in 1997. His first involvement with KMFDM was on the album Symbols. He wrote and sang the song "Anarchy", which became a hit in clubs, and spawned subsequent remixes of the track done by Skold himself. His next album with KMFDM, Adios, was released in 1999. Skold took a more prominent role in the band, not only as co-vocalist, co-writer, and bassist, but also as producer, engineer, and programmer, alongside KMFDM's founder Sascha Konietzko.

Due to turmoil within the band, Konietzko and Skold ended KMFDM in 1999, and restarted as MDFMK the following year. They released one album, MDFMK, released in 2000 by Universal Records. The band, including Lucia Cifarelli (formerly of Drill), took on a more "futuristic" sound, which contained less of the industrial rock KMFDM was known for, and added a mix of drum & bass, trance and europop, primarily in a production style leaning towards "electronica". MDFMK featured all three members sharing vocal duties. Their song "Missing Time" was used in the animated movie Heavy Metal 2000.

In 2002, the trio reformed KMFDM along with Raymond Watts, and released Attak. Afterwards, Skold departed the band. Due to a commitment to produce Marilyn Manson's album The Golden Age of Grotesque, Skold was unable to join KMFDM's 2002 Sturm & Drang tour; he did, however, make two guest appearances at shows in June.

On 16 December 2008 the KMFDM website announced that Skold and Konietzko would be releasing an album together, titled Skold vs. KMFDM. The album was released on 24 February 2009.

Skold did production and instrumentation work on KMFDM's album Blitz, released 24 March 2009. Later that same year he contributed a remix to Left Spine Down's 2009 remix album entitled Voltage 2.3: Remixed and Revisited, as well as 16volt's album American Porn Songs.

Newlydeads & ohGr
Skold performed a show as a fill-in guitarist with Taime Downe's The Newlydeads on 13 December 2000 at the Pretty Ugly Club in Los Angeles. Skold, on bass, joined ohGr, a project of Skinny Puppy vocalist Nivek Ogre, for the tour in support of its first album, Welt, in 2001, although he does not appear on the album.

Marilyn Manson

Skold's involvement with Marilyn Manson began as producer for the single "Tainted Love", which is featured in the 2001 teen comedy/parody movie Not Another Teen Movie and appeared on the soundtrack. Manson and Skold went on to score the movie Resident Evil, released in 2002. Several tracks are featured on the Resident Evil movie soundtrack.

Skold officially joined Marilyn Manson in 2002 after the departure of bassist Twiggy Ramirez. At this time, not only was Skold the bassist for the band, but he was also producing, editing, creating artwork, electronics, programming drums and beats, playing guitar, keyboards, accordion and synthesizer bass for the album The Golden Age of Grotesque.

He is described by Manson as, "the power that attitude brings to an album". On the band's 2004 release, Lest We Forget: The Best Of, Skold produced, played lead guitar, and sang backup vocals on the cover version of "Personal Jesus", which was also released as a single. Coinciding with the release of The Nightmare Before Christmas in 3D in October 2006, Manson and Skold contributed a cover of "This Is Halloween" to The Nightmare Before Christmas soundtrack, with Skold taking care of the music while Manson provided the vocals.

This time also saw the start of work on Marilyn Manson's sixth studio album entitled Eat Me, Drink Me. The album was released worldwide on 5 June 2007.

Skold played guitar on the band's 2007 world tour, Rape of the World, with Rob Holliday (formerly guitarist/bassist for Curve, Gary Numan, The Mission and The Prodigy) taking over bass duties.

On 9 January 2008, Marilyn Manson posted a bulletin on MySpace which reported that Skold had left the band and former bassist Twiggy Ramirez had returned to take his place.

In mid-November 2021, Rolling Stone reported that Skold was again working with Manson.

Doctor Midnight & The Mercy Cult
In 2009, Skold formed the Scandinavian supergroup Doctor Midnight & The Mercy Cult with Hank von Helvete. They released their debut album, I Declare: Treason, on 6 June 2011.

Motionless in White
Skold, along with Jason Suecof, produced Motionless in White's 2012 studio album Infamous. Skold also contributed songwriting on 5 songs. Skold was also announced as a featured artist on the song "Final Dictvm" from the album Reincarnate.

Not My God
In January 2020, Skold and Nero Bellum announced a new project dubbed Not My God. Their self-titled album was released on 14 February 2020. The follow-up album, Simulacra, was released on 15 October 2021.

Musical styles
Skold has performed many different music genres ranging from glam metal to heavy metal to industrial rock to electro-industrial. Shotgun Messiah evolved from being a hair metal band to playing industrial rock for their third and final album.  Beginning with the Skold solo project, Tim Skold has recorded and performed mainly with industrial acts such as KMFDM, ohGr, and The Newlydeads.  Doctor Midnight & The Mercy Cult he performed heavy metal and hard rock, with a Gothic rock feel to it.

Musical equipment
Throughout his career Skold has played several different instruments and used equipment from different manufacturers, here is a list of notable equipment.

Guitars and bass guitars
 Gibson Les Paul – Black finish
 Gibson Firebird V – Cream white finish
 Gibson Firebird V – Black finish
 Gibson Firebird VII – Red finish
 Jackson X Series Kelly KEXM – White finish
 Roland G-707 Guitar Synthesizer
 Gretsch Broadkaster G6119B Bass – Orange
 Gretsch Broadkaster G6119B Bass – Walnut Stain
 Gretsch Broadkaster G6119B Bass – Red finish
 Gretsch Broadkaster G6119B Bass – Bamboo finish
 Gretsch Broadkaster G6119B Bass – Black finish
 King doublebass – White with black flames
 King doublebass – Wood
 D'Addario XL Strings
 Dunlop Tortex Picks

Effects
 Dunlop Cry Baby Bass Wah Wah
 Dunlop MXR M-103 Blue Box
 BOSS GT-6
 BOSS GT-6B Multi-Effects Units
 Dunlop MXR Smart Gate Pedal
 Dunlop MXR 10 Band EQ
 Dunlop MXR GT-OD Overdrive
 Dunlop MXR Distortion III

Amplification
Ampeg SVT-4PRO head
Ampeg SVT-810E cabinet
Blankenship Variplex (2)
Marshall Amps
BIAS MINI

Discography

Kingpin
 "Shout It Out" (1987)
 Welcome to Bop City (1988)

Shotgun Messiah
 Shotgun Messiah (1989)
 "Shout It Out" (1989)
 "Don't Care 'Bout Nothin'" (1990)
 Second Coming (October 1991)
 "Heartbreak Blvd." (1991)
 "Red Hot" (1991)
 "Living Without You" (1992)
 I Want More (1992)
 Violent New Breed (1993)
 "Enemy in Me" (1993)
 "Violent New Breed" (1993)

SKOLD
 Skold (30 July 1996)
 Neverland (1996) (EP)
 Dead God (2002) (unreleased demo, subsequently released in 2022)
 "I Will Not Forget" (2009) (single)
 "A Dark Star" (2009) (single)
 "Bullets Ricochet" (2009) (single)
 "Suck" (2011) (Single)
 Anomie (2011)
 Tonight (2011) (single)
 The Undoing (2016)
 Never Is Now (2019)
 Dies Irae (2021)
 Dead God (2022)
 Blasphemous Rumours (2023) (Single)

KMFDM
 Symbols (1997)
 "Megalomaniac" (1998)
 Adios (1999)
 "Boots" (2002)
 Attak (2002)
 Blitz (2009)

MDFMK
 MDFMK (2000)

Marilyn Manson
 "Tainted Love" (2001)
 Resident Evil Soundtrack (2002)
 The Golden Age of Grotesque (2003)
 Lest We Forget: The Best Of (2004)
 Eat Me, Drink Me (2007)

Skold vs. KMFDM
  Skold vs. KMFDM (2009)

Doctor Midnight & The Mercy Cult
"(Don't) Waste It" (2011)
I Declare: Treason (2011)

Motionless in White
 "Mallevs Maleficarvm" (Tim Skold Remix) (2012)
 Infamous (production) (2012)
 "Final Dictvm" (feat. Tim Skold) (2014)

Aesthetic Perfection
 Imperfect (live CD/DVD) (acoustic guitar) (recorded 2013, released 2015)

Not My God
 NOT MY GOD (2020)
 Simulacra (2021)

Filmography 
 In God's Hands (1998)
 Doppelherz (2003)
 Better the Devil (2016)

References

External links

Official website

Living people
Industrial musicians
KMFDM members
Marilyn Manson (band) members
Swedish heavy metal bass guitarists
Shotgun Messiah members
Metropolis Records artists
Dependent Records artists
OhGr members
Doctor Midnight & The Mercy Cult members
Industrial metal musicians
Year of birth missing (living people)